Marghzar or Morghzar or Morgh Zar or Murgh Zar may refer to:
 Marghzar, Ardabil
 Marghzar, Faruj, North Khorasan
 Morghzar, Jajrom, North Khorasan
 Marghzar, Shirvan, North Khorasan
 Marghzar, Razavi Khorasan
 Marghzar, South Khorasan

See also
 Murghazar, Pakistan